Stanbury Cottage is a historic building at 232 St. George Street in St. Augustine, Florida. It is part of the St. Augustine Town Plan Historic District. On October 8, 2008, it was added to the U.S. National Register of Historic Places. Stanbury Cottage is one of the oldest examples of Carpenter Gothic architecture in Florida. The house has historic connections to Henry Flagler, Andrew Anderson, and Martin J. Heade who were often guests of the Stanburys.

References

National Register of Historic Places in St. Johns County, Florida
Houses on the National Register of Historic Places in Florida
Houses in St. Johns County, Florida